Nos lleva la tristeza ("We Take the Sadness") is a 1965 Mexican film and stars Sara García.

External links
 

1965 films
Mexican Western (genre) films
1960s Spanish-language films
1960s Mexican films